Abdulkasimovo (Abdulqasim) is a rural locality (a village) in Kunakbayevsky Selsoviet of Uchalinsky District, Bashkortostan, Russia. The population was 15 as of 2010. There are 2 streets.

Geography 
Abdulkasimovo is located 19 km northwest of Uchaly (the district's administrative centre) by road. Yuldashevo is the nearest rural locality.

Ethnicity 
The village is inhabited by Bashkirs.

References 

Rural localities in Uchalinsky District